Salvador Moyà-Solà (born 1955) is a Spanish paleontologist. He works in the Institut Català de Paleontología Miquel Crusafont in Sabadell, Catalonia. From 1983 to 2006, he was affiliated with the Diputación Provincial de Barcelona. In 2006 he became investigator of the Physical Anthropology unit of the  Universidad Autónoma de Barcelona.

He is an expert in primates of the miocene. He has directed two important excavations in Catalonia:
Can Llobateres, in Sabadell (Barcelona province), where he found remains of Dryopithecus laietanus, the first Catalan fossil, nicknamed “Jordi.”
Barranc de Can Vila 1, in Els Hostalets de Pierola (Barcelona province), where he found the species Pierolapithecus catalaunicus, nicknamed “'Pau.”

External links 
 Interview with Salvador Moyà-Solà on the FECYT.
 Articles published by Salvador Moyà-Solà.

1955 births
Living people
Spanish paleontologists
Spanish anthropologists